George Washington Vanderbilt II (November 14, 1862 – March 6, 1914) was an art collector and member of the prominent Vanderbilt family, which amassed a huge fortune through steamboats, railroads, and various business enterprises. He commissioned the construction of a 250-room mansion, the largest privately owned home in the United States, which he named Biltmore Estate.

Biography

George W. Vanderbilt was the youngest child of William Henry Vanderbilt and Maria Louisa Kissam. Though there is no evidence to suggest that he referred to himself using a numerical suffix, various sources have called him both George Washington Vanderbilt II and III. The Biltmore recognizes him as George W. Vanderbilt III, because he had two uncles by that name, the first of whom died at the age of four.

As the youngest of William's children, George was said to be his father's favorite and his constant companion. Relatives described him as slender, dark-haired, and pale-complexioned. Shy and introverted, his interests ran to philosophy, books, and the collection of paintings in his father's large art gallery. He acquired a private library of more than twenty thousand volumes. In addition to frequent visits to Paris, France, where several Vanderbilts kept homes, George Vanderbilt traveled extensively and became fluent in several foreign languages.

His father owned elegant mansions in New York City and Newport, and an  country estate on Long Island.  When William died in 1885 of a stroke, he left a fortune of approximately $200 million, the bulk of which was split between his two elder sons, Cornelius Vanderbilt II and William K. Vanderbilt. George W. Vanderbilt had inherited $2 million from his grandfather and received another million dollars on his 21st birthday from his father. Upon his father's death, he inherited $5 million more, as well as the income from a $5 million trust fund.

He ran the family farm at New Dorp and Woodland Beach, now the neighborhood of Midland Beach, on Staten Island, New York, where he was born, then lived with his mother in Manhattan until his own townhouse at 9 West 53rd Street was completed in 1887. The Vanderbilt family business was operated by his elder brothers. This left him time for intellectual pursuits. In 1891, he joined the New York Society of the Sons of the American Revolution. The next year Vanderbilt gifted his private gallery on 58th Street in Manhattan to the American Fine Arts Society. During the early 1900s, the Vanderbilts developed a pair of residences at 645 and 647 Fifth Avenue. George was the first owner of number 647.

Biltmore

 
Living in one or another of his family residences well into adulthood, Vanderbilt decided to construct his own country mansion and estate in 1888. For this purpose, he acquired 125,000 acres of woodland in North Carolina, employing the architect Richard Morris Hunt to design a limestone house modeled on the Chateau de Blois and other chateaux of the Loire Valley. With up to four acres of floor space, this is believed to be the largest domestic dwelling ever constructed in the United States.

At Biltmore, Vanderbilt led the life of a country gentleman. Having a great interest in horticulture and agriscience, he oversaw experiments in scientific farming, animal bloodline breeding, and silviculture (forestry). His goal was to run Biltmore as a self-sustaining estate. In 1892, Frederick Law Olmsted suggested that Vanderbilt hire Gifford Pinchot to manage the forests on the estate. According to Pinchot, who went on to be the first Chief of the United States Forest Service, Biltmore was the first professionally managed forest in the U.S. It was also the site of the Biltmore School of Forestry, the first such school in North America, established in 1898 by Dr. Carl A. Schenck.

Vanderbilt was known for his generosity toward his employees at Biltmore. Every year, he held a Christmas celebration for their children, complete with decorated tree and presents for each child, even those who could not make it to the party. He also paid all the expenses of the Cathedral of All Souls, an Episcopal cathedral he'd built and was a parishioner of, located directly across from the Biltmore Estate's main gate in Biltmore Village (the model village he had built for those who had worked to build the Estate or were employed on the Estate), so that the church's weekly collection could go directly to charity and outreach.

Family
On June 1, 1898, Vanderbilt married Edith Stuyvesant Dresser (January 17, 1873 – December 21, 1958) at the American Cathedral in Paris, France. George and Edith had one daughter together, Cornelia Stuyvesant Vanderbilt (August 22, 1900 - February 7, 1976).

In 1912, George and Edith booked passage on the doomed Titanic, but they changed their plans at the last minute via telephone, instead sailing on her sister ship, the Olympic. The Olympic left port before Titanic, and the Vanderbilts arrived in New York before the sinking. Accounts vary, but it has been suggested that a family member (reportedly his wife's well-travelled sister) warned the pair from travelling on Titanic, saying, "so many things can go wrong on a maiden voyage". According to Vanderbilt family history, George's mother had a premonition about Titanic and advised George from boarding. It's possible both warnings were acknowledged and heeded. In any case, Edith, in a letter to her friend Emily Ford Skeel (sister of Paul Leicester Ford), explained: "For no reason whatsoever we decided to sail on the Olympic and had only 18 hours to get ready in. We were homesick, and simply felt we must get home, and changed our ship, as I say, at the Eleventh hour!" Unfortunately, however, a servant to the Vanderbilts, Frederick Wheeler, perished aboard Titanic in second class, as, due to the close timing of their switch, the Vanderbilts were forced to leave most of their luggage aboard Titanic, and so Wheeler retained his ticket to travel with it.

Death
Vanderbilt died of complications following an appendectomy in Washington, D.C., on March 6, 1914. He was interred in the Vanderbilt family mausoleum at the Moravian Cemetery in New Dorp in Staten Island, New York.

Legacy

She sold additional land as finances demanded; today, about  remain. Edith Dresser Vanderbilt later married Peter Goelet Gerry (1879–1957), a United States Senator from Rhode Island.

The Vanderbilts' only child, Cornelia Stuyvesant Vanderbilt, married a British aristocrat, the Hon. John Francis Amherst Cecil (a descendant of William Cecil, 1st Baron Burghley) in 1924. Their sons, George and William, eventually inherited the property. George Cecil, the elder of the two sons, chose to inherit the majority of the estate's land and the Biltmore Farms Company, which was more profitable than the house at the time. The younger son, William Cecil, was thus left with Biltmore House, and he is credited with preserving the chateau which (though still privately owned) is open to the public.

References

Further reading
Vanderbilt, Arthur T. II. (1989) Fortune's Children: The Fall of the House of Vanderbilt New York: Quill / William Morrow. . p. 40 (the death of G. W. Vanderbilt 1), pp. 55–83 (William H. Vanderbilt), pp. 271–279 (George W. Vanderbilt III).
Curiosity served: Biltmore opens servants' quarters at The San Diego Union-Tribune December 25, 2005

External links

Biltmore Estate website
Antiques of the Biltmore Estate

1862 births
1914 deaths
American art collectors
American people of Dutch descent
George Washington II
People from Asheville, North Carolina
People from Staten Island
People included in New York Society's Four Hundred
George Washington II
George Washington II
Burials at the Vanderbilt Family Cemetery and Mausoleum